The Middlesex Avenue–Woodwild Park Historic District is a historic district located in the borough of Metuchen in Middlesex County, New Jersey. The district was added to the National Register of Historic Places on July 31, 2017. It includes 197 contributing buildings, five contributing objects, and one contributing site.

Gallery of contributing properties
Selected properties that are key, that is, the most important to the district in terms of architecture or history, as described by the nomination form.

References

External links
 
 

Metuchen, New Jersey
National Register of Historic Places in Middlesex County, New Jersey
Historic districts on the National Register of Historic Places in New Jersey
Colonial Revival architecture in New Jersey
Tudor Revival architecture in New Jersey
Mission Revival architecture in New Jersey
American Craftsman architecture in New Jersey
Gothic Revival architecture in New Jersey
Queen Anne architecture in New Jersey
Italianate architecture in New Jersey
Greek Revival architecture in New Jersey
New Jersey Register of Historic Places
Historic American Buildings Survey in New Jersey